Ignatów may refer to:
Ignatów, Łódź Voivodeship, Poland
Ignatów, Lublin Voivodeship, Poland